Diplodiscus verrucosus is a species of flowering plant in the family Malvaceae sensu lato or Tiliaceae. It is found only in Sri Lanka.

Culture
It is known as "දික්වැන්න - dikwenna" in Sinhala, and as "vidpani" in Tamil.

References

verrucosus
Endemic flora of Sri Lanka